The following is a list of notable people associated with Saginaw, Michigan. These people were born or lived in Saginaw.

Artists
E. Irving Couse, artist
Curtis Harding, musician
Robert Nickle, artist
Stevie Wonder, musician

Business, academic, and labor figures
Sewell Avery, chairman of U.S. Gypsum Corporation and Montgomery Ward
Edward G. Begle, mathematician specializing in topology; director of the School Mathematics Study Group, credited with developing what came to be known as new math
Wellington R. Burt, wealthy industrialist
Harold J. Grimm, professor of history and expert on Protestant Reformation
Nafe Katter, professor of theatre at the University of Connecticut

Government, political, and military figures

Entertainment figures

Sports figures

Writers and journalists
George F. Lewis, journalist, proprietor of newspapers
Doug Peacock, author, grizzly bear expert, lecturer
Theodore Roethke, poet

See also
 List of mayors of Saginaw

References

Saginaw
Saginaw